SS Marietta E was a British cargo ship completed by William Hamilton & Co in Port Glasgow on the Firth of Clyde in June 1940. She had a single 520 NHP triple-expansion steam engine built by David Rowan and Company of Glasgow, that drove a single screw.

She was owned by Leith Hill Shipping Co Ltd and managed by Counties Ship Management Co Ltd of London (CSM), both of which were offshoots of the Rethymnis & Kulukundis shipbroking company. She was named after Marietta Eustathiou, a member of Nicholas Eustathiou shipping
concerns that had a major shareholding in her.

Sinking
Early in 1943 she sailed from New York, bound for Alexandria in Egypt via Durban and Aden. She was laden with a cargo of government and commercial stores and deck cargo of eight LCPL landing craft. In Durban she joined convoy DN-21 to Alexandria via Aden. At 0346 hrs on 4 March in the Indian Ocean east of East London,  fired two torpedoes at the convoy, one of which sank the Marietta E killing four crew and one DEMS gunner. South African Navy rescue launch R8 rescued the Master, 33 crew and six DEMS gunners and landed them at Durban.

References

Further reading

Ships built on the River Clyde
Steamships of the United Kingdom
1940 ships
Ships of Counties Ship Management
Maritime incidents in March 1943
Ships sunk by German submarines in World War II
World War II shipwrecks in the Indian Ocean
World War II merchant ships of the United Kingdom